Jacques Cellerier (1742–1814) was a French architect in the neoclassical style whose buildings can be seen mainly in Paris and Dijon.

Life 
Together with his friend the sculptor Jean-Antoine Houdon, he was pensionnaire du Roi in Rome before being appointed engineer of the Généralité of Paris. His work was mainly focused on private mansions and theatres.

A supporter of the Lumières, he drew the imposing funeral chariot that carried the ashes of his friend Voltaire to the Panthéon in 1791.

In 1790, he made the drawings for the triumphal arch of the Champ-de-Mars for the Fête de la Fédération.

In 1807, Napoleon I charged him with the task of erecting a monument to the glory of his victories over the English and Russians. He was finally replaced for this project by Jean-Antoine Alavoine.

In 1812, Napoleon entrusted him with the project of building a palace of the Archives, the first stone of which was laid on August 15, Saint Napoleon's Day, the Emperor being in the middle of the Russian campaign in front of Smolensk. This palace of the Archives was to be located in the new administrative district designed by the Emperor and was to face the Palace of the King of Rome, at one of the four ends of the Champ de Mars, at the east and along the river Seine. Its realization was to be entrusted to Cellerier. The events of 1815 and the fall of the Empire, however, put an end to this project, which remained unfinished.

In 1813, he used again the gothic style for the first time since the completion of the Cathédrale Sainte-Croix d'Orléans, at the Basilica of Saint-Denis, which was endowed with a richly decorated Gothic chapel. Cellerier also built a neoclassical winter choir.

Gallery

Realisations

In Paris 
 Théâtre de l'Ambigu-Comique, boulevard du Temple (1769)
 Hôtel de Verrière, rue Verte-Saint-Honoré (1774)
 Hôtel of Mme d'Épinay, rue de la Chaussée-d'Antin (1776-1777)
 House of Duke of Laval, boulevard du Montparnasse (1777)
 Hôtel built for Cousin de Méricourt at 19 boulevard Poissonnière. Cellerier lived in.
 La maison du prince de Soubise, rue de l'Arcade (1787-1788)
 Théâtre des Variétés, boulevard Montmartre (1806-1807).
 Restoration of the Porte Saint-Denis (1807)

In Dijon 
 , rue Vannerie (trésorier des États de Bourgogne) (1779).
 Grand Théâtre de Dijon, place du Théâtre. Cellerier only started it because his first stone was laid in 1810, but the work was suspended from 1811 to 1822. They resumed under the direction of the Parisian architect Vallot; the monument was completed in 1828
 , rue de la Préfecture

In Maisons-Alfort 
 Development of the school known as the Royal Veterinary School of Alfort, currently École nationale vétérinaire d'Alfort.

In Compiègne  
 Former prison (1773-1778)

In Tremblay-en-France 
 Rehabilitation of the Saint-Médard church (1781)

In Châtenay-en-France 
 Saint-Martin Church (1784-1787).

In Saint-Germain-en-Laye 
 Modification of the manhole of Hennemont in Saint-Germain-en-Laye (1787).

References

External links 
 Biographie 
 Coupe sur la longueur de la salle de spectacles de Dijon, 3rd project, 1787, watercolor plan by Jacques Cellerier

See also 
 Neoclassical architecture

1742 births
1814 deaths
Architects from Dijon
Burials at Père Lachaise Cemetery
French neoclassical architects
18th-century French architects
19th-century French architects
Directors of the Paris Opera